is a Japanese football player for Kamatamare Sanuki from 2023. He scored a goal from 60 metres for Akita on October 14, 2020.

Career 

On 31 October 2022, Eguchi leave from the club after 6 years at Akita.

On 21 December 2022, Eguchi officially transfer to J3 club, Kamatamare Sanuki for upcoming 2023 season.

Career statistics 

Updated to the end 2022 season.

Club

Honours
 Blaublitz Akita
 J3 League (2): 2017, 2020

References

External links
Profile at Blaublitz Akita
Profile at Ehime FC

60 meter goal

1992 births
Living people
Osaka Sangyo University alumni
Association football people from Osaka Prefecture
Japanese footballers
J2 League players
J3 League players
Ehime FC players
Blaublitz Akita players
Kamatamare Sanuki players
Association football midfielders